Fontaine is a commune in the Territoire de Belfort department, Bourgogne-Franche-Comté, northeastern France.

See also

Communes of the Territoire de Belfort department

References

Communes of the Territoire de Belfort